Lewicka  may refer to:

People 

 Karolina Lewicka (born 1981), Polish film director and writer
 Marta Lewicka (born 1972), Polish-American professor of mathematics
 Olga Lewicka (born 1975), Polish born visual artist

Other 
Cegielnia Lewicka, village in Poland

Surnames of Polish origin